Kay Mander (born Kathleen Molyneux Mander; 28 September 1915 – 29 December 2013) was a British non-fiction film director and shooting continuity specialist.

Early life and education 

Mander was born in Kingston upon Hull, the only child of Thomas Hope Mander, an accountant and bookkeeper, and Mable Fanny (nee Jacob). Mander lived in Kingston upon Hull for seven years. She spent her childhood, when not boarding at Queenwood Ladies' College in Eastbourne, in France and Germany due to her father's work for an American radiator company, National Radiators, taking him to Europe. It was in Paris she showed an interest in photography.

She moved to Berlin to join her parents after failing an Oxford Scholarship exam. She considered several professions including teaching, journalism and acting, even joining an ex-pat amateur dramatics club.

Career 

In 1935, Mander worked as a secretary at Joseph Goebbels's International Film Congress. There she met several delegates of the British feature film industry who encouraged her to look for employment in the British film industry. She contacted them for a job when she returned to Britain. Her first job in the film industry was as an interpreter for German cameraman Hans Schneeberger. Schneeberger was in London working on the aviation docudrama Conquest of the Air (1936) for producer Alexander Korda, of London Films. She then spent several years working in traditionally "female" departments such as publicity, budget and production before moving into continuity.

In 1940, she was offered a job at Shell Film Unit making instructional films by producer Arthur Elton. Her debut film as a director was How to File (1941), intended as a training tool for the aircraft construction industry. Mander was praised for her innovative use of tracking shots following the movement of the file. Mander directed four more instructional films for Shell Film Unit, two for the recently restructured Fire Service and another for the Ministry of Home Security. These films were highly complex and technical and made for specialised audiences but were characterised by clarity, simplicity and skilful technical exposition.

Mander went on to direct up to fifty instructional and promotional films in the UK and overseas.  One of her best known films is Homes for the People (1945) which used the technique of allowing working class women to describe their living conditions, one of them vividly slating the design of her suburban house and summing up: "I call it a muck-up".

In the 1950s, Mander and her husband, fellow filmmaker Rod Neilson Baxter, returned from Indonesia where they had helped set up a film unit. After directing a feature film for the Children's Film Foundation, The Kid from Canada (1957), Mander returned to continuity work, later saying that "I palpably had the skills" but could not face "battling" to continue directing.

She spent most of the rest of her career working in continuity on feature films, including From Russia with Love, The Heroes of Telemark and Fahrenheit 451.

Kay Mander went to live in Kirkcudbrightshire and died in Castle Douglas, Scotland on 29 December 2013. She is commemorated with a green plaque on The Avenues, Kingston upon Hull.

Politics 

During the 1930s, Mander joined the Communist Party of Great Britain (CPGB) and attended Left Book Club meetings. Her political leanings would later influence her filmmaking. In 1937, she was the first woman to join the film industry's union, the Association of Cinematographic Technicians (ACT) (now BECTU). She had a column in the ACT journal, The Cine-Technician, until the 1950s, where she wrote union issues such as the need for equal pay and post-war job security. After the end of World War II, her membership of the CPGB made it more difficult for her to find work.

References 

General references
Kay Mander interview: BECTU History Project c.1988, listening copy held in BFI National Library

 A 2-disc DVD compilation of Kay Mander's films for the 1940s and a documentary on her life by Dr Adele Carroll.

External links

1915 births
2013 deaths
British women film directors
British documentary film directors
People from Kingston upon Hull
Women documentary filmmakers